Bill Carson (July 8, 1926 – February 15, 2007), born in Meridian, Oklahoma, was a California Western swing guitarist for whom Leo Fender originally designed the Fender Stratocaster electric guitar in the early 1950s. Carson has documented his close relationship to the Strat in his autobiography, Bill Carson – My Life and Times with Fender Musical Instruments (co-written by Willie G. Moseley). In reference to the Stratocaster's "Custom Contouring", he once said, "It fits better to your body like a well tailored shirt should."

External links
Fender.com
Bill Carson Strat
"Bill Carson: Chuck Yeager of the Stratocaster"
The Stratocaster - A True Thoroughbred of Electric Guitars
Guardian obituary

American country guitarists
American male guitarists
American country singer-songwriters
Western swing performers
2007 deaths
1926 births
20th-century American guitarists
20th-century American singers
20th-century American male musicians
American male singer-songwriters